Secqueville may refer to:

 Garcelles-Secqueville, Calvados département, France
 Secqueville-en-Bessin, Calvados département, France
 Secqueville-Hoyau, a French automobile producer, 1919–1924